The Netherlands Football League Championship 1923–1924 was contested by 51 teams participating in five divisions. The national champion would be determined by a play-off featuring the winners of the eastern, northern, southern and two western football divisions of the Netherlands. Feijenoord won this year's championship by beating Stormvogels, NAC, SC Enschede and Be Quick 1887.

New entrants
Eerste Klasse East:
 Promoted from 2nd Division: Vitesse Arnhem
Eerste Klasse North:
 Promoted from 2nd Division: VV Leeuwarden
Eerste Klasse South:
 Promoted from 2nd Division: Alliance
Eerste Klasse West-I
 Six clubs moving in from last season's combined Western Division: AFC Ajax, Football Club Dordrecht, Feijenoord, HVV Den Haag, RCH and VOC
 Promoted from 2nd Division: HVV 't Gooi, Koninklijke HFC, SVV & ZFC
Eerste Klasse West-II
 Six clubs moving in from last season's combined Western Division: Blauw-Wit Amsterdam, HFC Haarlem, HBS Craeyenhout, HC & CV Quick, Sparta Rotterdam and UVV Utrecht
 Promoted from 2nd Division: Ajax Sportman Combinatie, SBV Excelsior, ODS and Stormvogels

Divisions

Eerste Klasse East

Eerste Klasse North

Eerste Klasse South

Eerste Klasse West-I

Eerste Klasse West-II

Championship play-off

References
RSSSF Netherlands Football League Championships 1898-1954
RSSSF Eerste Klasse Oost
RSSSF Eerste Klasse Noord
RSSSF Eerste Klasse Zuid
RSSSF Eerste Klasse West

Netherlands Football League Championship seasons
1923–24 in Dutch football
Netherlands